The men's discus throw at the 2019 Asian Athletics Championships was held on 21 April.

Results

References
Results

Discus
Discus throw at the Asian Athletics Championships